During the 1985–86 English football season, Everton F.C. competed in the Football League First Division. They finished 2nd in the table with 86 points.

Final league table

Results

FA Charity Shield

Football League First Division

FA Cup

League Cup

Football League Super Cup

Squad

References

1985-86
Everton
Everton F.C. season